Richard Allen "Blue" Mitchell (March 13, 1930 – May 21, 1979) was an American trumpeter and composer who worked in jazz, rhythm and blues, soul, rock and funk. He recorded albums as leader and sideman for Riverside, Mainstream Records, and Blue Note.

Early life 
Mitchell was born and raised in Miami, Florida, United States. He began playing trumpet in high school, with the nickname "Blue".

Career 
After high school, he played in the rhythm & blues ensembles of Paul Williams, Earl Bostic, and Chuck Willis. He returned to Miami and was heard by Cannonball Adderley, with whom he recorded for Riverside Records in New York in 1958.

Mitchell then joined the Horace Silver Quintet, playing with tenor saxophonist Junior Cook, bassist Gene Taylor, and drummer Roy Brooks. Mitchell stayed with Silver's group until the band's break-up in 1964, after which Mitchell formed a group with members from the Silver quintet, substituting the young pianist Chick Corea for Silver and replacing Brooks, who had fallen ill, with drummer Al Foster. This group produced a number of records for Blue Note. It disbanded in 1969, after which Mitchell joined and toured with Ray Charles until 1971.

From 1971 to 1973 Mitchell, performed with John Mayall, appearing on Jazz Blues Fusion and subsequent albums. From the mid-1970s, he recorded and worked as a session man in the genres noted previously, performed with the big band leaders Louie Bellson, Bill Holman, and Bill Berry, and was the principal soloist for Tony Bennett and Lena Horne. Other band leaders Mitchell recorded with are Lou Donaldson, Grant Green, Philly Joe Jones, Jackie McLean, Hank Mobley, Johnny Griffin, Al Cohn, Dexter Gordon, and Jimmy Smith.

Death 
Mitchell performed with the Harold Land quintet until he died from cancer on May 21, 1979, in Los Angeles, aged 49.

Discography

As leader/co-leader

As sideman

References

External links
Blue Mitchell site
Blue Mitchell leader discography

1930 births
1979 deaths
African-American jazz musicians
American jazz trumpeters
American male trumpeters
Blue Note Records artists
Mainstream Records artists
Musicians from Miami
RCA Records artists
20th-century American musicians
20th-century trumpeters
20th-century American male musicians
American male jazz musicians
The Capp-Pierce Juggernaut members
Supersax members